Fedir Kyrylovych Hlukh (18 September 1912 – 4 August 1984, Kyiv) was a Soviet and Ukrainian lawyer and statesman. 

Born in Beyeve, Kharkov Governorate (now Lypova Dolyna Raion, Sumy region), from 1963 to 1983 he was the prosecutor general of the Ukrainian Soviet Socialist Republic (a role which at that time was subordinate to the Procurator General of the Soviet Union).

References

1912 births
1984 deaths
People from Sumy Oblast
People from Kharkov Governorate
Yaroslav Mudryi National Law University alumni
Recipients of the Order of Lenin
Recipients of the Order of the Red Banner of Labour
Recipients of the Order of the Red Star
Ukrainian jurists
Kazakhstani prosecutors
Prosecutors of the Ukrainian Soviet Socialist Republic
Judges of the Supreme Court of Ukraine
Soviet justice ministers of Ukraine
Central Committee of the Communist Party of Ukraine (Soviet Union) members
Fourth convocation members of the Verkhovna Rada of the Ukrainian Soviet Socialist Republic
Fifth convocation members of the Verkhovna Rada of the Ukrainian Soviet Socialist Republic
Sixth convocation members of the Verkhovna Rada of the Ukrainian Soviet Socialist Republic
Seventh convocation members of the Verkhovna Rada of the Ukrainian Soviet Socialist Republic
Eighth convocation members of the Verkhovna Rada of the Ukrainian Soviet Socialist Republic
Ninth convocation members of the Verkhovna Rada of the Ukrainian Soviet Socialist Republic
Tenth convocation members of the Verkhovna Rada of the Ukrainian Soviet Socialist Republic